Busby Noble (1959/1960 – 23 March 2022) was a New Zealand Māori activist and Antarctic adventurer. He died of cancer.

References

1960 births
2022 deaths
New Zealand Māori activists
Deaths from cancer
Explorers of Antarctica